José Navarro Aramburu (born 24 September 1948 in Lima) is a Peruvian football defender who played for Peru in the 1978 FIFA World Cup.

Career
Navarro earned 30 caps for Peru between 1972 and 1979. He also played for Sporting Cristal.

References

External links
 
 

1948 births
Living people
Footballers from Lima
Association football defenders
Peruvian footballers
Peru international footballers
Peruvian Primera División players
Deportivo Municipal footballers
Sporting Cristal footballers
Juan Aurich footballers
1975 Copa América players
1978 FIFA World Cup players
Copa América-winning players